The Logie for Most Popular Lifestyle Program is a Silver Logie award presented annually at the annual Australian Logie Awards. The award recognises the popularity of an Australian lifestyle program or series giving expert advice on lifestyle matters.

It was first awarded at the 32nd Annual TV Week Logie Awards ceremony, held in 1990 and originally called Most Popular Lifestyle Program.  It was briefly renamed Best Lifestyle Program. From 2018, the award category name was reverted to Most Popular Lifestyle Program.

The winner and nominees of Most Popular Lifestyle Program are chosen by the public through an online voting survey on the TV Week website. Better Homes and Gardens holds the record for the most wins, with twelve, followed by Burke's Backyard and Backyard Blitz with six wins each.

Winners and nominees

Multiple wins

References

External links

Awards established in 1990